The Safety Match, or The Swedish Match is a 1954 Soviet comedy film directed by Konstantin Yudin, an adaptation of Anton Chekhov's 1884 story of the same name.

Plot 
The inhabitants of the county discovered the body of the dead retired cornet Mark Klyauzov. At the scene of the crime was a charred Swedish match, which led investigators to think about a chain of terrible events. But it's not as simple as it seems.

Cast
 Alexey Gribov as Magistrate Nikolai Yermolayevich Chudikov
 Andrei Popov as Detective Emil Dyukovsky
 Mikhail Yanshin as Police Capt. Yevgraf Kuzmich
 Nikolai Gritsenko as Psekov, estate manager
 Nikolai Kurochkin as Yefrem, majordomo
 Vladimir Kolchin as Nikolai Tetekho 
 Tamara Nosova as Akulina
 Ksenia Tarasova as Maria Ivanovna Klyauzova
 Marina Kuznetsova as Olga Petrovna Kuzmich
 Mikhail Nazvanov as Mark Ivanovich Klyauzov
 Vladimir Pokovsky as The Doctor
 Georgy Gyeorgiu as Police Official

Critics 
Elena Bauman of the Soviet Screen magazine called the movie "one of the first signs of the new "free" cinema" (referring to the Khrushchev Thaw era) "which — as it seemed — accidentally stepped over the stone-dead canons, playfully challenged the sedate art style of those years". According to her, even the title challenged the official patriotic campaign against cosmopolitans, while the movie itself worked as a satire on KGB. At the same time, she noted the superb ensemble cast that consisted of some of the biggest comedy names and a very authentic portrait of Anton Chekhov's period and writings.

Legacy 
During 2015 which was declared the Year of Literature in Russia The Safety Match was widely shown at various film festivals and retro movie screenings across the country as part of the programme dedicated to 155 years since Anton Chekhov's birth.

References

External links 
 
 The Safety Match at BFI

1954 films
Soviet crime comedy films
1950s Russian-language films
1950s crime comedy films
Mosfilm films
Films based on works by Anton Chekhov
1954 comedy films
Films based on short fiction